Nikola Milošević may refer to:

 Nikola Milošević (politician) (1929–2007), Serbian writer, political philosopher, literary critic, and politician
 Nikola Milošević (footballer, born 1993), Serbian football midfielder
 Nikola Milošević (footballer, born 1996), Serbian footballer
 Nikola Milošević (water polo) (born 2001), Croatian water polo player
 Nikola Milošević (handballer) (born 1994), Serbian handball player for RK Borac Banja Luka
 Nikola Milošević (sambo), Serbian sambo fighter at the 2013 Summer Universiade